Haemonchus is a genus of nematodes belonging to the family Trichostrongylidae.

They are abomasal parasites that cause anemia, followed by white eye disease.

The genus has cosmopolitan distribution.

Species:

Haemonchus contortus 
Haemonchus longistipes
Haemonchus placei 
Haemonchus similis

References

Nematodes